Caledanapis is a genus of South Pacific araneomorph spiders in the family Anapidae, first described by Norman I. Platnick & Raymond Robert Forster in 1989.

Species
 it contains six species, all found on New Caledonia:
Caledanapis dzumac Platnick & Forster, 1989 – New Caledonia
Caledanapis insolita (Berland, 1924) – New Caledonia
Caledanapis peckorum Platnick & Forster, 1989 – New Caledonia
Caledanapis pilupilu (Brignoli, 1981) – New Caledonia
Caledanapis sera Platnick & Forster, 1989 – New Caledonia
Caledanapis tillierorum Platnick & Forster, 1989 – New Caledonia

References

Anapidae
Araneomorphae genera
Spiders of Oceania
Taxa named by Raymond Robert Forster